Wat Maheyong is a Buddhist temple in Ayutthaya, Thailand. It was originally built in 1438, during the reign of King Borommarachathirat II, and restored in 1711 by King Thai Sa.

The major buildings in this temple are its chedi (stupa) and ubosot (ordination hall). The chedi's platform is supported by 80 sculpted elephants, and its ubosot is currently under worship.

References 

Buddhist temples in Phra Nakhon Si Ayutthaya Province
15th-century Buddhist temples
1438 establishments in Asia